Christiane Micheline Guary (1 October 1925 – 25 December 2022), better known as Micheline Gary, was a French film and stage actress who was active in the French film industry throughout the 1950s. In 1960 she married the actor Paul Meurisse.

Gary died in Paris on 25 December 2022, at the age of 97.

Selected filmography
 Mammy (1951)
 An Artist with Ladies (1952)
 Endless Horizons (1953)
 The Lovers of Midnight (1953)
 Quay of Blondes (1954)
 The Big Flag (1954) 
 Ali Baba and the Forty Thieves (1954)
 The Sheep Has Five Legs (1954)
 The Beautiful Otero (1954)
 Caroline and the Rebels (1955)
 Stopover in Orly (1955)
 Maid in Paris (1956)
 Serenade of Texas (1958)
 The Doctor's Horrible Experiment (1959)
 Picnic on the Grass (1959)

References

Bibliography
 Goble, Alan. The Complete Index to Literary Sources in Film. Walter de Gruyter, 1999.

External links

1925 births
2022 deaths
20th-century French actresses
French film actresses
French stage actresses
People from Landes (department)